Inge Strell (born 17 December 1947) is an Austrian figure skater. She competed in the pairs event at the 1964 Winter Olympics.

References

1947 births
Living people
Austrian female pair skaters
Olympic figure skaters of Austria
Figure skaters at the 1964 Winter Olympics
Figure skaters from Vienna